Austin Reed was a British fashion retailer founded in 1900, and the brand was acquired by Edinburgh Woollen Mill in 2016.

History
Austin Reed was founded by tailor Austin Leonard Reed (1873–1954).

Timeline

 1900 - First London shop was opened in Fenchurch Street
 1911 - Opening of flagship store in Regent Street
 1929 - The first international outlet on the transatlantic liner RMS Aquitania
 1930 - The opening of the Regent St Barbers Shop
 1936 - Opening of a concession on the RMS Queen Mary
 1946 - Opening of a concession on the RMS Queen Elizabeth
 1940s - Winston Churchill was a customer here.
 1980s - The launch of Austin Reed's womenswear
 2000 - UK Manufacturing, at its Crewe factory ended
 In 2005, Kosugi-Sangyo was the Austin Reed ready-to-wear license holder in Japan with retail value of €50 million.
 2009 - The Austin Reed Group acquires heritage brand Viyella
 2010 - The launch of the Q Club on the third floor of the Regent Street store
 2011 - Austin Reed move from the original 103-113 Regent Street Store to the opposite side (100 Regent Street)
 2016 - Austin Reed entered administration. Five concessions located in Boundary Mills outlet villages will stay open following a buyout by Edinburgh Woollen Mill.

Operations
Austin Reed also owned the CC brand (rebranded from Country Casuals).

References 

Austin Reed is mentioned by Captain Peacock on the British situation comedy, Are You Being Served. Cast member John Inman had worked at Austin Reed as a tie clerk in the early 1950s.

External links 
 Official website
 

Clothing retailers of the United Kingdom
Clothing brands of the United Kingdom
British companies established in 1900
British Royal Warrant holders
1900 establishments in England
Shops in London
Suit makers
Retail companies established in 1900
Companies that have entered administration in the United Kingdom